Philipe Sampaio Azevedo (born 11 November 1994) is a Brazilian professional football player who plays as a centre-back for Botafogo.

Career
Born in São Paulo, Sampaio is a youth prospect from Santos FC, which loaned him out in 2014 to Paulista in the Campeonato Paulista.

On 24 July 2014, Sampaio travelled to Portugal to go on a tryout at Boavista, that proved successful, with the 19-year-old signing for three seasons.  He made his professional debut against S.L. Benfica at 24 August 2014.

On 2 July 2017, Sampaio signed a four-year contract with Akhmat Grozny. He was released by Akhmat on 3 July 2018.

On 21 August 2018, he returned to Portugal, signing with Feirense. A year later, he moved to C.D. Tondela on a two-year deal.

On 1 July 2020, he signed a four-year contract for Ligue 2 club EA Guingamp for a fee of €1.9m.

On 9 March 2022, Sampaio returned to Brazil and signed a three-year contract with Botafogo.

Club

Notes

References

External links

1994 births
Living people
Footballers from São Paulo
Brazilian footballers
Association football defenders
Santos FC players
Paulista Futebol Clube players
FC Akhmat Grozny players
C.D. Feirense players
C.D. Tondela players
Boavista F.C. players
En Avant Guingamp players
Botafogo de Futebol e Regatas players
Primeira Liga players
Russian Premier League players
Ligue 2 players
Brazilian expatriate footballers
Expatriate footballers in Portugal
Expatriate footballers in Russia
Expatriate footballers in France
Brazilian expatriate sportspeople in Portugal
Brazilian expatriate sportspeople in Russia
Brazilian expatriate sportspeople in France